The Yavuz class are a group of four frigates that were built for the Turkish Navy. They were designed in Germany and are part of the MEKO family of modular warships; in this case the MEKO 200 design. An order for ships was signed by the Turkish government in April 1983 for four MEKO frigates. Two ships were built in Germany and two in Turkey with German assistance. They are similar in design to the larger s of the Turkish Navy, which are improved versions of the Yavuz-class frigate.

The Turkish Navy has an ongoing limited modernization project for an electronic warfare suite. The intent is to upgrade the ships with locally produced the ECM, ECCM systems, active decoys, LWRs, IRST and the necessary user interface systems.

The Yavuz-class ships are expected to be replaced by the s.

Ships

See also
List of Turkish current frigates
List of Turkish Navy ships

Citations

References
Gardiner, Robert; Chumbley, Stephen & Budzbon, Przemysław (1995). Conway's All the World's Fighting Ships 1947–1995. Annapolis, Maryland: Naval Institute Press. .

External links

Frigate classes
Frigates of Germany